The Austro-Turkish War (1663–1664) or fourth Austro-Turkish War was a short war between the Habsburg monarchy and the Ottoman Empire. The Ottoman aim was to resume the advance in central Europe, conquer Vienna and subdue Austria. The Ottomans managed to capture key strongholds, however, the Habsburg army under Raimondo Montecuccoli succeeded in halting the Ottoman army in the Battle of Saint Gotthard.

Prelude 
The cause of this war was the invasion of Poland in 1658 by Prince George Rákóczy II of Transylvania, without the permission of the Porte. Transylvania had after the Battle of Mohács in 1526 recognized Ottoman suzerainty and paid a tribute to the Porte and were given political and religious autonomy in return. On hearing about Rákóczy's unauthorized war, the Ottomans declared war on their vassal. It was not long before Grand Vizier Köprülü Mehmed Pasha (Vizier 1656–1661) defeated Rákóczy and conquered Transylvania. The new Transylvanian prince, János Kemény, fled to Vienna seeking Austrian support.

Emperor Leopold I, not wishing to see Transylvania fall under direct Ottoman control, sent Montecuccoli into Hungary with 10,000 men. Montecuccoli's advance into Transylvania was met with contempt by the local populace and his army was ineffective due to disease and privation. 

Meanwhile, in order to liberate Croatia and Hungary, Nikola Zrinski, the Ban of Croatia, had since 1661 been doing his best to start a new Austro-Ottoman conflict by organizing raids into Ottoman territory from his stronghold, Novi Zrin (Hungarian: Zrínyiújvár). These raids and the presence of Montecuccoli's army made the Ottomans end the status-quo with Vienna, which had existed between them since 1606.

1663 campaign 

In the summer of 1663, an Ottoman army of more than 100,000 strong under Grand Vizier Köprülü Fazıl Ahmed entered Habsburg Hungary and in September conquered the town of Érsekújvár (Nové Zámky).

The Habsburg commander Montecuccoli had only his 12,000 men and the 15,000 Hungarian-Croatian troops of Nikola Zrinski to oppose the Turks.

Emperor Leopold I summoned the Imperial Diet in January 1663, to ask the German and European Kings for help, with success. An army of 30,000  Bavarian, Brandenburg and Saxon troops was raised. Even arch-enemy Louis XIV of France sent an army corps of 6,000 under Jean de Coligny-Saligny in support.

Ottoman Turks and Tatars invaded Moravia in 1663. The invasion devastated eastern and southern Moravia, and the towns of Vsetín, Uherský Brod, Uherské Hradiště, Hodonín, Břeclav and Hustopeče were pillaged. Thousands of Moravians were killed and the Turks and Tatars took 40,000 captives to be sold as slaves.

1664 campaign 
At the beginning of 1664, the Imperial Army was divided into three corps: In the south, 17,000 Hungarian-Croatian troops under the command of Nikola Zrinski. In the center, the main army of Montecuccoli, which was 28,500 men strong, and in the north some 8,500 men under General Jean-Louis Raduit de Souches. There were some 12,500 men in reserve to defend the fortresses.

This army of 66,500 men was not united, as the differences of opinion between the commanders were very strong, especially with Zrinski.

As a preparation for campaigns planned for 1664, Zrinski set out to destroy the strongly fortified Ottoman bridge (the Osijek (Hung.:Eszék) bridge) which, since 1566, had linked Darda (Hung.:Dárda) to Osijek across the Drava and the marshes of Baranya. Destruction of the bridge would cut off the retreat of the Ottoman Army and make any Turkish reinforcement impossible for several months. Re-capturing strong fortresses (Berzence, Babócsa, the town of Pécs, etc.) on his way, Zrinski advanced 240 kilometers on enemy territory and destroyed the bridge on February 1, 1664. He didn't succeed in conquering Nagykanizsa, the main objective. The siege had to be lifted when in June the main army of Köprülü approached.

The Turks besieged and conquered Zrinski's stronghold Novi Zrin, which had to be abandoned when Montecuccoli refused to come to its rescue. Zrinski would never forgive this, which would eventually lead to the Magnate conspiracy ("Zrinski-Frankopan conspiracy" in Croatia, and "Wesselényi conspiracy" in Hungary).

Battle of Saint Gotthard 

After the conquest of Novi Zrin, the Ottoman main army marched towards Vienna. As the Ottoman army advanced into Hungary, it was stopped at the Rába river between Mogersdorf and the Szentgotthárd Abbey by Montecuccoli's army, where the Ottomans were charged and defeated by the Imperial forces.

In the north of Hungary the army of de Souches had also won some smaller victories against Küçük Mehmed Pasha. Most importantly, he reconquered Nitra and Léva.

Peace of Vasvár 

Nine days later, on August 10, 1664, the Peace of Vasvár was signed. The Habsburgs recognized Ottoman control of Transylvania, Nagyvarad (Grosswardein) and Ersekujvar (Neuhausel), Habsburg troops were to be removed from Transylvania and had to turn over numerous border fortresses, and they agreed to pay an annual 200,000 florins to the Ottoman Empire. In contrast, the Ottomans agreed to send an annual "gift" to the Habsburg Emperor, allow the construction of a Habsburg fort along the Waag river, and granted a twenty-year truce.

The major factor in the Habsburgs' decision for a peace treaty was the French threat to the much more valuable estates in the Netherlands, Germany and Italy. Moreover, the Imperial war effort lost some of its momentum after the victory of Saint Gotthard, as the French withdrew from the coalition while other German princes were reluctant to advance further east. Hence, the Austrians did not believe they could liberate the whole of Hungary and were unwilling to leave the French advance unchecked for a few Hungarian fortresses.

Consequences 
The Croats and Hungarians were outraged at the loss of the conquered territories and felt the initiative and momentum after the victory of Saint Gotthard should have been maintained. The discontent from the Vasvar treaty led to the Magnate conspiracy.

The peace in fact held for 20 years until the Ottomans attacked Vienna for the second time in 1683 and were pushed back from Hungary in the following Great Turkish War (1683–1699).

Notes

References

Sources

Further reading
Military Transition in Early Modern Asia, 1400–1750: Cavalry, Guns, Government and Ships
“The Imminent Danger of the Turks”: Ottoman Expansion, Hungarian Revolt, and Habsburg Fear of War (1670–1672)

 
Conflicts in 1663
Conflicts in 1664
Wars involving Bavaria
Wars involving Brandenburg-Prussia
Wars involving Croatia
Wars involving France
Wars involving Hungary
Wars involving Saxony